Connect2 is a five-year project run by Sustrans beginning in 2006 to develop new walking and cycle routes in 79 communities around the UK.

Project 

Connect2 is a five-year project run by Sustrans. It involves the creation of new cycle and walking routes, bridges and other facilities in 79 locations around the UK. It aims to create new networks of local paths, improve cycling and walking access and to connect local areas.

Sustrans launched the 'Connect2' project in August 2006 in a successful bid to win £50 million from the Big Lottery's 'Living Landmarks; The People's Millions' competition. It was one of four shortlisted projects competing in a public vote for the grant and Connect2 was announced as the winning project on 12 December 2007.

It is estimated that Connect2 will pass within half a mile of: 3,280,000 people; 1,426,000 households; 1,355 schools; 500,000 pupils; and 57 of the most deprived boroughs in the UK. With the aim to give the benefits of: 61.5 million trips a year are expected to be made on the routes; 79,500 tonnes of  could potentially be saved per annum if each of the journeys had replaced a car trip; £135 million of funding in total will be generated by Connect2; and 116 local authorities are working to deliver Connect2.

Schemes 
There are 79 Connect2 projects around the UK and distributed throughout the regions. The tables below were compiled from a complete list of Connect2 projects available on the OpenStreetMap wiki under a Creative Commons Attribution-ShareAlike 2.0 license.

East of England

East Midlands

London

North East England

Northern Ireland

North West England

Scotland

South East England

South West England

Wales

West Midlands

Yorkshire

References 

Cycling in the United Kingdom
Proposed transport infrastructure in the United Kingdom
Proposed transport infrastructure in England
Proposed transport infrastructure in Wales
Proposed transport infrastructure in Northern Ireland
Proposed transport infrastructure in Scotland